Conasprella ichinoseana is a species of sea snail, a marine gastropod mollusk in the family Conidae, the cone snails and their allies.

Like all species within the genus Conasprella, these cone snails are predatory and venomous. They are capable of "stinging" humans.

Description
The size of an adult shell varies between 50 mm and 105 mm.

Distribution
This species occurs in the Pacific Ocean from the Philippines to Japan, off Northwest Australia and Vanuatu, the Solomon Islands, New Caledonia; in the South China Sea off Vietnam.

References

 Kuroda, T. 1956. New species of the Conidae (Gastropoda) from Japan. Venus 19(1):1–15, figs. 7–10, pl. 1
 Hinton, A. 1972. Shells of New Guinea and the Central Indo-Pacific. Milton : Jacaranda Press xviii 94 pp.
 Wilson, B. 1994. Australian Marine Shells. Prosobranch Gastropods. Kallaroo, WA : Odyssey Publishing Vol. 2 370 pp.
 Röckel, D., Korn, W. & Kohn, A.J. 1995. Manual of the Living Conidae. Volume 1: Indo-Pacific Region. Wiesbaden : Hemmen 517 pp.
 Filmer R.M. (2001). A Catalogue of Nomenclature and Taxonomy in the Living Conidae 1758 - 1998. Backhuys Publishers, Leiden. 388pp.
 Tucker J.K. (2009). Recent cone species database. 4 September 2009 Edition
  Puillandre N., Duda T.F., Meyer C., Olivera B.M. & Bouchet P. (2015). One, four or 100 genera? A new classification of the cone snails. Journal of Molluscan Studies. 81: 1–23

External links
 The Conus Biodiversity website
 To Biodiversity Heritage Library (1 publication)
 To Encyclopedia of Life
 To USNM Invertebrate Zoology Mollusca Collection
 World Register of Marine Species
 
Cone Shells – Knights of the Sea
 Specimen at MNHN, Paris

ichinoseana
Gastropods described in 1956